Herbert Ellis (born Herbert Siegel; January 17, 1921 – December 26, 2018) was an American character actor and writer. He was best known for his collaborations with Jack Webb, and he frequently portrayed law enforcement officers in film and television.

Born in Cleveland, Ohio, Ellis began his career in Hollywood in the late 1940s. Ellis and Webb together devised the name and concept for Dragnet after collaborating on an unsuccessful project titled Joe Friday, Room Five.  He played Officer Frank Smith in eight episodes of the original Dragnet series. He played Frank La Valle in 23 episodes of The D.A.'s Man, and he played
Beat bistro owner, painter and sculptor Wilbur in five episodes of Peter Gunn. Ellis and Webb later worked together on Dragnet 1966 and Dragnet 1967.

From 1959 to 1962, Ellis was cast as Dr. Dan Wagner in seven episodes of the CBS military sitcom/drama series, Hennesey, starring Jackie Cooper as a United States Navy physician, with Abby Dalton as nurse Martha Hale.

Ellis was married to Sylvia Siegel, and they had two children. He died on December 26, 2018, at his home in  San Gabriel, California. He was 97.

Filmography

References

External links

1921 births
2018 deaths
Male actors from Ohio
American male film actors
American male television actors
Male actors from Cleveland
Male actors from Los Angeles